Second Winter is the third studio album by Texas blues guitarist Johnny Winter, released in 1969. The original plan was to edit the songs from the recording session into one album but it was later thought that all the recordings were good enough to be released. The album was released as a "three-sided" LP, with a blank fourth side on the original vinyl. Two more songs, "Tell the Truth" and "Early in the Morning" were left unfinished but released on a 2004 re-release of the album.

Track listing

Personnel
Musicians
Johnny Winter – guitar, mandolin, vocals
Edgar Winter – piano, organ, harpsichord, alto saxophone, vocals
"Uncle" John Turner – percussion
Tommy Shannon – bass
Dennis Collins – bass on "The Good Love"
Production
Johnny Winter – producer
Edgar Winter – production consultant 
Steve Paul – spiritual producer
Ed Kollis – engineer
Tony Lane – album design
Richard Avedon – cover photography

References

1969 albums
Johnny Winter albums
Columbia Records albums